Cantonese is a language originating in Canton, Guangdong.

Cantonese may also refer to:
 Yue Chinese, Chinese languages that include Cantonese
 Cantonese cuisine, the cuisine of Guangdong Province
 Cantonese people, the native people of Guangdong and Guangxi
 Lingnan culture, the regional culture often referred to as Cantonese culture

See also
 Cantonese Braille, a Cantonese-language version of Braille in Hong Kong
 Cantopop, Cantonese pop music